Boone Township is one of twelve townships in Porter County, Indiana. As of the 2010 census, its population was 6,160.

History
Boone Township was organized in 1836.

The Clinton D. Gilson Barn was listed on the National Register of Historic Places in 1984.

Cities and towns
The largest community in the township is Hebron.

Education
Boone Township is served by the Metropolitan School District of Boone Township.  Their high school is Hebron High School.

Cemeteries

References

External links
 Indiana Township Association
 United Township Association of Indiana

Townships in Porter County, Indiana
Townships in Indiana